Now! is a 1963 album by jazz saxophonist Sonny Stitt, his first of two albums released by Impulse! Records.

Track listing
All compositions by Sonny Stitt, unless otherwise noted

"Surfin'" - 4:12
"Lester Leaps In" (Lester Young) - 6:23
"Estralita" - originally spelled "Estrellita" (Manuel Ponce) - 3:17
"Please Don't Talk About Me When I'm Gone" (Sam Stept, Sidney Clare) - 4:34
"Touchy" - 5:13
"Never ---SH!" - 5:07
"My Mother's Eyes" (Abel Baer, L. Wolfe Gilbert) - 4:08
"I'm Getting Sentimental Over You" (George Bassman, Ned Washington) - 4:14

Personnel
Sonny Stitt - alto saxophone  & tenor saxophone
Hank Jones - piano
Al Lucas - bass
Osie Johnson - drums

References

1963 albums
Sonny Stitt albums
Impulse! Records albums
Albums produced by Bob Thiele